Drybridge railway station was a railway station serving the village of Drybridge, North Ayrshire, Scotland.

History

The station was opened on 6 July 1812 by the Kilmarnock and Troon Railway.  The Glasgow, Paisley, Kilmarnock and Ayr Railway took over management of the station on 16 July 1846, while its successor, the Glasgow and South Western Railway, took over full ownership in 1899. The station closed on 3 March 1969.

The station named 'Drybridge' in Moray was renamed 'Letterfourie' by the London, Midland and Scottish Railway who had acquired both stations.

Today Drybridge station has its platforms intact (although overgrown), and the station building is now a private residence. The line is still open as the 'Burns Line', part of the Glasgow South Western Line.

The village of 'Drybridge' is so named after the fact that most bridges up until the era of the railways were built over watercourses and were therefore 'wet bridges'; a name applied to the nearby Laigh Milton Viaduct.

Visible from the station is the only surviving standing stone on the mainland in North Ayrshire.

References

Notes

Sources 
 
 
 
 Wilkinson, Brian (1988). The Heilan Line. The Portessie Branch of the Highland Railway. Dornoch : Dornoch Press. .

External links
 YouTube video of Drybridge Railway Station
 YouTube of the hidden 1812 'Dry Bridge'

Disused railway stations in North Ayrshire
Railway stations in Great Britain opened in 1812
Railway stations in Great Britain closed in 1969
Former Glasgow and South Western Railway stations
Beeching closures in Scotland
Irvine, North Ayrshire